Lefortovo is a station on the Bolshaya Koltsevaya line of the Moscow Metro. The station was opened on 27 March 2020 as part of Nekrasovskaya line extension.

Name
The Station is named for the Lefortovo District of Moscow. The district's name comes from Franz Lefort, a Russian military officer and confidant of Peter the Great.

Construction

Construction on the tunnels began in August 2016. The tunneling equipment reached Lefortovo in August 2017. The second tunnel reached the station in October 2017.

References

Moscow Metro stations
Railway stations in Russia opened in 2020
Bolshaya Koltsevaya line